State Trunk Highway 191 (often called Highway 191, STH-191 or WIS 191) is a  state highway in southeastern Iowa County in the US state of Wisconsin that runs east–west from Dodgeville to Hollandale.

Route description
Following East Division Street through town, WIS 191 starts in downtown Dodgeville at the intersection with WIS 23 (Iowa Street). The highway runs through some residential neighborhoods before exiting town. At the intersection with Bennett Road, WIS 191 turns to southeasterly through fields to run under US Highway 151 (US 151); the state highway lacks a direct connection with the latter freeway. WIS 191 turns to a more easterly course after the freeway, running through southwest Wisconsin farm country. Near Tom's Campground, the highway turns to follow a southeastward course toward Hollandale. At the intersection with County Trunk Highway K (CTH-K) north of town, WIS 191 turns due south to enter the city. At Commerce Street, the highway turns southeasterly again until Main Street. There, WIS 191 follows Main Street south to its terminus at the intersection with WIS 39/CTH-K.

History
WIS 191 was designated in 1947 and remains unchanged since.

Major intersections

See also

References

External links

191
Highway 191